Ken Watkins (17 August 1919 – 18 April 1984) was an  Australian rules footballer who played with North Melbourne in the Victorian Football League (VFL).

Notes

External links 

1919 births
1984 deaths
Australian rules footballers from Victoria (Australia)
North Melbourne Football Club players